Duda Brack, stage name of Eduarda Brack (Porto Alegre, 17 September 1993), is a Brazilian singer.

In 2015 Duda Brack released her debut album É independently. It started to be developed in 2013, when she had over half the songs ready and called Bruno Giorgi (Lenine's son). In an interview for Veja, Brack cited Fiona Apple, Gal Costa and Ana Cañas as references for the album.

In 2017, she joined Secos & Molhados  tribute band Primavera nos Dentes, along with Charles Gavin, Paulo Rafael, Pedro Coelho and Felipe Ventura.

In November 2021, she released her second album Caco de Vidro, featuring Ney Matogrosso and produced by her and Gabriel Ventura.

Discography 
 É (2015)
 Caco de Vidro (2021)

References

External links 
 

1993 births
Living people
People from Porto Alegre
Musicians from Rio Grande do Norte
21st-century Brazilian women singers
21st-century Brazilian singers
Brazilian women guitarists